John B. Munyan (November 14, 1860 – February 18, 1945) was a Major League Baseball catcher. His career in the minor leagues spanned 12 years, from  until .

Sources

Major League Baseball catchers
Cleveland Blues (1887–88) players
Columbus Solons players
St. Louis Browns (AA) players
Harrisburg Olympics players
Binghamton Crickets (1880s) players
Bridgeport Giants players
Columbus Senators players
Springfield Senators players
Minneapolis Minnies players
Quincy Ravens players
Omaha Omahogs players
Baseball players from Pennsylvania
1860 births
1945 deaths